The 2008–2009 UCI Track Cycling World Cup Classics was a multi race competition over a season of track cycling. The season ran from 31 October 2008 to 18 February 2009. The World Cup is organised by the Union Cycliste Internationale.

The World Cup kicked off in Manchester, Great Britain on 31 October 2008. Although many of the top riders did not participate in this round, as they were still recovering from the 2008 Summer Olympics, this gave many less experienced riders an opportunity to make their mark in the competition.

171 riders were on the start list for the second round in Melbourne, Australia, held from 20 to 22 November 2008. New talent was prevalent once more, demonstrated by Cyclingnews' statistics which showed that 100 of those riders were under the age of 23 and only 12 were over 30.

The third round was held at the newly renovated Alcides Nieto Patiño Velodrome in Cali, Colombia from 12 to 14 December 2008. 166 athletes competed in this round, representing 30 different countries.

For the fourth round, held from 16 to 18 January 2009, riders returned to the Beijing velodrome in China for the first time since the 2008 Summer Olympics. Temperatures in the velodrome were much lower than the sweltering heat experienced by the riders during the summer, this time it was approximately 16 degrees indoors.

The fifth and final round was held in Copenhagen, Denmark from 13 to 15 February 2009. British paralympic rider Darren Kenny also made an appearance at Copenhagen, a world record attempt had been scheduled during the World Cup, on 14 February. Kenny intended to attempt to break his own CP 3 World Hour Record of 41.817 km which was set in Manchester on 8 January 2005.

As the five rounds of the World Cup were held scattered around the world, only a few riders were able to participate in every round. Those who attended the first two rounds were able to rise to the top of the overall series standings, this led to many unfamiliar names appearing at the top of the rankings.

Overall team standings
Overall team standings are calculated based on total number of points gained by the team's riders in each event. With one round remaining, 60 teams have so far participated in the 2008–2009 UCI Track Cycling World Cup Classics. The top ten teams are listed below:

Results

Men

Women

References

External links

Round 1, Manchester results and standings
Round 2, Melbourne results and standings
Round 3, Cali results and standings
Round 4, Beijing results and standings
Round 5, Copenhagen results and standings

See also

 2008–09 UCI Track Cycling World Ranking
2008 in track cycling

 
World Cup Classics
World Cup Classics
UCI Track Cycling World Cup